The Skins Billiards Championship was an annual nine-ball tournament held in the US. It was promoted by Allen Hopkins Productions and Billiards International, and was broadcast on ESPN. While prize money in other events is fixed, such that players win money depending on where they finish in the tournament bracket, the prize money a player earns in the Skins Billiards Championship depends on the course of the game. This tournament get its name because its format is based on skins game, a variation of golf.

Format
Two players play in each rack. When a player wins one, he/she stays to the play the next. The defeated player is replaced by another who has the option to have the break shot or pass it.

The table above shows an example of racks listed with each having a certain monetary value. To win prize money, a player must win three consecutive racks. The first three rack above are worth $3,000 each. Should a player win all three, he/she wins the total sum of them, $9,000.

If no player wins the racks in a row, the monetary value of the racks not won will be added to next until one player successfully manages to win three in a row.

If a player wins the eleventh money rack without winning the previous one and goes on to win the twelfth, an extra rack is added to the match where he/she has to win to earn any money. And if a player wins the twelfth money rack without winning the previous one, he/she will have to win two extra racks to win any money.

When all the racks concluded and there's still money to be won, the four players draw spots to play in the sudden-death playoff. The first two players will face each other in one rack then so will the next two. The winner of the two brackets face each other in one last rack where the winner takes all the remaining money.

Winners

2007 event and prize money decline
After not being held since 2005, the Skins Billiards Championship once again held another edition in the beginning of 2007. Four players compete in the event like in previous years. However, two play as a team making a doubles match.

The 2007 event wasn't any better compared to its earlier editions. In the 2005, the tournament had a total purse was $130,000. But it declined to $40,000 in 2007. Also, the number of players in contention have decreased from 16 to 4. The reason to these declines were never explained.

References

External links
 Official Site
Will Skins Be Must-See TV?

Pool competitions
Defunct sports competitions
Recurring events disestablished in 2007